Hestiasula kastneri is a species of praying mantis in the genus Hestiasula in the order Mantodea.

See also
List of mantis genera and species

References

kastneri
Insects described in 1942